Kycia Akira Knight (born 19 February 1992) is a Barbadian cricketer who plays as a wicket-keeper. In October 2018, she was named in the West Indies squad for the 2018 ICC Women's World Twenty20 tournament in the West Indies. In July 2019, Cricket West Indies awarded her with a central contract for the first time, ahead of the 2019–20 season. She plays domestic cricket for Barbados and Trinbago Knight Riders.

In October 2021, she was named in the West Indies team for the 2021 Women's Cricket World Cup Qualifier tournament in Zimbabwe. In February 2022, she was named in the West Indies team for the 2022 Women's Cricket World Cup in New Zealand. In July 2022, she was named in the Barbados team for the cricket tournament at the 2022 Commonwealth Games in Birmingham, England.

References

Further reading

 

1992 births
Living people
West Indies women One Day International cricketers
West Indies women Twenty20 International cricketers
Barbadian women cricketers
West Indian women cricketers
Trinbago Knight Riders (WCPL) cricketers
Twin sportspeople
Cricketers at the 2022 Commonwealth Games
Commonwealth Games competitors for Barbados
Barbados women Twenty20 International cricketers